Nintendo European Research & Development (NERD) is a French subsidiary for Nintendo, located in Paris, which develops software technologies and middleware for Nintendo platforms. This includes retro console emulators, patented video codecs, and DRM technology.

The organization originated as Mobiclip and Actimagine with notable customers including Nintendo, Sony Pictures Digital, and Fisher-Price. Nintendo licensed Mobiclip compression technology for the Game Boy Advance and Nintendo DS video game consoles, used by popular games such as Square Enix's Final Fantasy III and Konami's Contra 4. Fisher-Price used them for its Pixter Multi-Media educational toy. Sony Pictures Digital and The Carphone Warehouse used Mobiclip software to deliver TV-like full-length movies on MicroSD memory cards for smart phones. Nintendo purchased the company, to create NERD.

History

Actimagine was established in March 2003 by a team of engineers (Eric Bécourt, Alexandre Delattre, Laurent Hiriart, Jérôme Larrieu, Sylvain Quendez) and a businessman (André Pagnac). Actimagine started out with mobile gaming consoles. The video compression technology offered by Mobiclip was an optimized response to the battery life and video quality requirements of Nintendo video gaming platforms: Game Boy Advance, Nintendo DS, Wii, and Nintendo 3DS.

The Mobiclip codec provides high video quality with low battery consumption and has been selected by major studios, such as Sony Pictures Digital, Paramount, Fox and Gaumont Columbia Tristar Films, and by leading handset manufacturers, such as Nokia or Sony Ericsson, to deliver video on memory cards for mobile phones.

In April 2006, Actimagine raised €3 million in equity financing from US venture capital firm GRP Partners. This first round of institutional fund raising enabled Actimagine to accelerate its business development in the US and Japan.
The same year, Adobe acquired Actimagine's Flash rendering engine optimized for mobile devices.

In 2008, Mobiclip launched the first application delivering live TV on the iPhone, a year before Apple.

In October 2011, Mobiclip was bought by Nintendo and is now a subsidiary of the latter. Since then it is now known as "Nintendo European Research & Development" or "NERD".

In 2017, the United States branch was merged with Nintendo Technology Development.

Mobiclip video codecs

Mobiclip was developed with a completely different algorithm from the one used for other video codecs on the market, based on minimal use of the processor resources, allowing battery life to be increased considerably and the cost of the hardware to be reduced.

Nintendo licensing
Nintendo selected Mobiclip as its main provider of video codec technologies on the Game Boy Advance, Nintendo DS, Nintendo Wii and Nintendo 3DS.
Major software titles used it for in-game cinematics, including:
GBA Video series on the Game Boy Advance
Dragon Quest IX: Sentinels of the Starry Skies on Nintendo DS
Professor Layton series on Nintendo DS and Nintendo 3DS
Fire Emblem Awakening on Nintendo 3DS.
Wii no Ma and Nintendo Channel on Wii.
eCrew Development Program, the extremely rare Japanese McDonald's training game for the Nintendo DS.
The Legendary Starfy on Nintendo DS.
Kingdom Hearts 358/2 Days on Nintendo DS.

List of technologies developed by NERD
 Mobiclip video codecs for smartphone / Game Boy Advance / Nintendo DS / Nintendo 3DS / Wii
 Media player for Wii U Internet Browser
 Wii U Chat (co-developed with Nintendo Software Technology and Vidyo)
 Kachikachi: NES emulator for NES Classic Edition Canoe: Super NES emulator for Super NES Classic Edition, including the Super FX chipset series.
 L-CLASSICS: NES/SNES/N64/Sega Genesis/Game Boy/GBA emulator support for Nintendo Switch Online
 Nintendo 64, GameCube, and Wii emulation in Super Mario 3D All-Stars
 Nintendo DS emulator on Wii U
 Super-stable 3D display on New Nintendo 3DS
 Nintendo Labo VR Kit, in collaboration with Nintendo EPD
 Downloadable Wii games on the Wii U eShop
 Deep learning middleware for Dr Kawashima's Brain Training for Nintendo Switch
 Heart rate detection system in Joy-Con, used in Ring Fit Adventure
 Providing expertise in areas such as steering control, low-latency video capture and streaming and location tracking for Mario Kart Live: Home Circuit
 Filtering Expertise and Gesture Tracking for Nintendo Switch Sports

References

Mobile content
Nintendo divisions and subsidiaries
Video game companies established in 2003
Companies based in Paris
Video game development companies
French subsidiaries of foreign companies